Kasich is an East Slavic language surname.

Notable people with the surname include:
 John Kasich (1952), American politician, author, and television news host 
 Karen Waldbillig Kasich (1963), American business executive and wife of Governor of Ohio

Americanized surnames
Russian-language surnames